Grêmio Foot-Ball Porto Alegrense is a Brazilian football club based in Porto Alegre, with an affiliated women's team.

Gremio, Grémio or Grêmio (Portuguese word for "guild") may also refer to:

Sport clubs

Rio Grande do Sul state
Grêmio Atlético Farroupilha, Brazilian football club based in Pelotas
Grêmio Esportivo Bagé, Brazilian football club based in Bagé
Grêmio Esportivo Brasil, Brazilian football club based in Pelotas
Grêmio Esportivo Glória, Brazilian football club based in Vacaria
Grêmio Esportivo São José, Brazilian football club based in Cachoeira do Sul
Grêmio Esportivo Sapucaiense, Brazilian football club based in Sapucaia do Sul
Grêmio Foot-Ball Santanense, Brazilian football club based in Antana do Livramento

São Paulo
Grêmio Barueri Futebol, Brazilian football club based in Barueri
Grêmio Catanduvense de Futebol, Brazilian football club based in Catanduva
Grêmio Esportivo Catanduvense, defunct Brazilian football club
Grêmio Esportivo Mauaense, Brazilian football club based in Mauá
Grêmio Esportivo Novorizontino, Brazilian football club based in Novo Horizonte
Grêmio Esportivo Osasco, Brazilian football club based in Osasco
Grêmio Esportivo Sãocarlense, Brazilian football club based in São Carlos

Santa Catarina
Grêmio Esportivo Juventus, Brazilian football club based in Jaraguá do Sul
Grêmio Esportivo Olímpico, Brazilian football club based in Blumenau

Amazonas
Grêmio Atlético Coariense, Brazilian football club based in Coari

Goiás
Grêmio Esportivo Anápolis, Brazilian football club based in Anápolis
Grêmio Esportivo Inhumense, Brazilian football club based in Inhumas

Paraná
Grêmio de Esportes Maringá, Brazilian football club based in Maringá

Pernambuco
Grêmio Esportivo Petribu, Brazilian football club

Mato Grosso
Grêmio Esportivo Jaciara, Brazilian football club based in Jaciara

Distrito Federal
Grêmio Esportivo Tiradentes, Brazilian football club based in Brasília

Rondônia
Grêmio Recreativo e Esportivo, Brazilian football club based in Espigão d'Oeste

Roraima
Grêmio Atlético Sampaio, Brazilian football club based in Boa Vista, Roraima

Porto Alegre
Grêmio Esportivo Renner, a Brazilian football club from Porto Alegre

Other
Gremio Lusitano, an amateur football team from Ludlow, Massachusetts
Arena do Grêmio, a new multi-use stadium in Porto Alegre, Brazil, that is currently in the construction stage
Gremio (Suikoden), fictional character
Gremio, an elderly suitor of Bianca in The Taming of the Shrew

People 
Michael Gremio (born Michael Smith, 1983), former lead vocalist of the power metal band Cellador